Olayinka Fredrick Oladotun "Freddie" Ladapo (born 1 February 1993) is an English professional footballer who plays as a forward for Ipswich Town.

Club career

Colchester United
Ladapo, born in Romford, England, scored close to a goal a game at youth level for Colchester United's Academy. On 1 March 2011, he was loaned to Conference South club Thurrock for work experience, and scored on his senior debut that day as a half-time substitute in a 3–1 home loss to Boreham Wood. On 30 March he was loaned to Chelmsford City of the same division.

He signed a professional one-and-a-half-year contract with Colchester in March 2012, and at the start of the following season, he was loaned to Bishop's Stortford in the Conference North. Ladapo made his first appearance for Colchester in the 2012–13 season, coming on as a 68th-minute substitute for Gavin Massey in a 3–1 home defeat to Brentford on 26 December 2012.

In June 2013, Ladapo signed a new one-year contract to keep him with Colchester for a further season, looking to add to his four first-team appearances he made during the 2012–13 season. He was then loaned out to Conference outfit Woking on 16 August 2013 for one month to bolster Garry Hill's strike-force. Ladapo was brought in to cover the suspended Giuseppe Solet. Featuring in the starting line-up against Chester on 17 August, Ladapo was replaced after 53 minutes by Joe McNerny who went on to score ten minutes later in the 2–0 victory.

Having previously failed to score in his four appearances for Woking, Ladapo was sent out on loan to fellow Conference team Nuneaton Town on 1 November for one month. He made his debut the following day in a 2–2 draw with Hyde, and scored the opening goal. In his next match against Welling United on 16 November, Ladapo was brought on as an 86th-minute substitute and subsequently scored an injury-time goal to win the game 2–1.

Kidderminster Harriers
On 24 January 2014, Ladapo joined Conference side Kidderminster Harriers on a free transfer from Colchester United. Ladapo was registered in time to face Premier League club Sunderland in the FA Cup fourth round the following day. He made his Harriers debut in the game as a 68th-minute substitute in front of a crowd of 25,081 as Kiddermister went down 1–0, Ladapo missing a late chance to level the game.

On 11 March 2014, Ladapo joined Conference South club Hayes & Yeading United on an initial one-month loan, and four days later he scored the only goal of a home win against Concord Rangers, the West London club's first victory of the calendar year. His loan was extended on 10 April until the end of the season.

On 30 July 2014, Ladapo joined Grays Athletic of the Isthmian League Premier Division on loan until January. Ladapo went on to make 26 appearances in the league, scoring 14 goals.

Margate
Kidderminster Harriers cancelled Ladapo's contract by mutual consent on 13 January 2015. The following day, he signed for Isthmian League Premier Division promotion chasers Margate. In March 2016 Ladapo went on trial to Crystal Palace, during which he scored a hat trick in an Under-21 match versus Watford.

Crystal Palace
On 30 March 2016,  Lapado joined Palace on a two-and-a-half-year contract for an undisclosed fee. While primarily used as a member of the development squad, in July 2016 he accompanied the first team on their North American tour and was named in the starting lineup for the first friendly match against Philadelphia Union.

On 30 August 2016, Ladapo joined Oldham Athletic on loan until 2 January 2017.

After his loan at Oldham expired, Ladapo joined fellow League One side Shrewsbury Town on a half-season loan deal on 5 January 2017. He made his debut for the club two days later, playing the entirety of a 1−1 draw away at Swindon Town, and scored the only goal of the match on his home debut against Bradford City a week later.

He made his Palace debut in a 4–0 away defeat at Manchester United on 30 September 2017 as a 74th-minute substitute for Bakary Sako.

Southend United
On 31 January 2018, Ladapo moved to League One side Southend United for an undisclosed fee, having been poised to join AFC Wimbledon earlier the same day and even arriving at the club’s stadium to undergo a medical before walking out midway through.

At the end of the 2017–18 season, having not scored  in ten appearances, he was released by the club.

Plymouth Argyle
After being released by Southend, Ladapo signed for fellow league team Plymouth Argyle.

He was Plymouth Argyle's top scorer in the 2018–19 season.

Rotherham United
On 25 June 2019, Ladapo signed a three-year contract with Rotherham United for £500,000, which represented a record transfer fee for the South Yorkshire club.

In January 2022, Ladapo put in a transfer request at Rotherham, which Rotherham accepted. At the time Ladapo's contract had just six months remaining meaning that, in the summer he would be able to leave on a free transfer. However, a club statement confirmed they have an option to extend his contract by 12 months. Ladapo left the club following their promotion back to the Championship at the end of the 2021–22 season upon the expiration of his contract.

Ipswich Town
On 30 May 2022, it was announced that Ladapo would be signing for Ipswich Town following the expiration of his contract at Rotherham, signing a three-year deal.

International career
Ladapo is eligible to represent either England or Nigeria at international level. In June 2011, Ladapo was invited to join a provisional training camp for the Nigeria under-20 team held at Bisham Abbey in preparation for the 2011 FIFA U-20 World Cup. However, he failed to make the final 21-man squad.

Career statistics

Honours
Rotherham United
EFL League One runner-up: 2019–20, 2021–22
EFL Trophy: 2021–22

References

External links

1993 births
Living people
Footballers from Romford
Association football forwards
English footballers
Nigerian footballers
Colchester United F.C. players
Thurrock F.C. players
Chelmsford City F.C. players
Bishop's Stortford F.C. players
Woking F.C. players
Nuneaton Borough F.C. players
Kidderminster Harriers F.C. players
Hayes & Yeading United F.C. players
Grays Athletic F.C. players
Margate F.C. players
Crystal Palace F.C. players
Oldham Athletic A.F.C. players
Shrewsbury Town F.C. players
Southend United F.C. players
Plymouth Argyle F.C. players
Rotherham United F.C. players
Ipswich Town F.C. players
English Football League players
National League (English football) players
Isthmian League players
Black British sportspeople
English people of Nigerian descent
English people of Yoruba descent
Yoruba sportspeople